Claudio Omar Moroni (born 27 May 1959) is an Argentine lawyer and politician who served as the country's Ministry of Labour, Employment and Social Security from 10 December 2019 to 13 October 2022, in the cabinet of President Alberto Fernández.

A career public official, Moroni has held a number of positions in the Argentine national administration. He was first appointed Superintendent of Insurance by President Carlos Menem in 1995, succeeding Alberto Fernández. Since then he has served as General Comptroller of the Nation from 2004 to 2007, as Executive Director of ANSES from 2007 to 2008, and as head of AFIP for a brief period in 2008, all under the successive presidencies of Néstor Kirchner and Cristina Fernández de Kirchner.

Early life and education
Moroni was born in 1959 in Buenos Aires. He studied law at the University of Buenos Aires, where he met Alberto Fernández; the two would later become close associates.

Political career
In 1995 he was appointed by the administration of President Carlos Saúl Menem to the Superintendency of Insurance, succeeding Alberto Fernández. A Justicialist Party member, Moroni left the position in 1998 and would not return to public office until after the presidency of Radical Fernando de la Rúa; he returned to the position upon being appointed by Eduardo Duhalde in 2002. In 2004, President Néstor Kirchner appointed Moroni to the General Comptrolling Bureau (SIGEN), succeeding Miguel Ángel Pesce; he would remain in charge of the SIGEN until 2007.

Upon the renovation of authorities following the ascension of President Cristina Fernández de Kirchner, Moroni left the SIGEN and was appointed Executive Director of the National Social Security Administration (ANSES), where he remained until 2008; from then he was appointed Federal Administrator of Public Income, but was removed from that position merely six months afterwards.

In addition to his work in the public sector, Moroni also served as a director of the executive board of Banco Provincia Group and as an insurance advisor in the Inter-American Development Bank.

Ministry of Labour
On 10 December 2019, following speculation that he might be appointed to the newly restored Ministry of Labour, Employment and Social Security, Moroni was appointed to the cabinet by newly elected President Alberto Fernández, succeeding Dante Sica.

He resigned on 13 October 2022 due to health reasons, and was succeeded by Raquel Olmos.

References

External links

Official website of the Ministry of Labour (in Spanish)

|-

|-

|-

|-

|-

1959 births
Living people
20th-century Argentine lawyers
Lawyers from Buenos Aires
University of Buenos Aires alumni
Ministers of labor of Argentina